Lucas Albrecht (born 9 January 1991) is a German footballer who plays as a defender for VSG Altglienicke.

References

External links
 
 

1991 births
Living people
German footballers
People from Neubrandenburg
Association football defenders
FC Hansa Rostock players
SV Babelsberg 03 players
TSG Neustrelitz players
KSV Hessen Kassel players
Kickers Offenbach players
VSG Altglienicke players
2. Bundesliga players
3. Liga players
Regionalliga players
1. FC Neubrandenburg 04 players
Footballers from Mecklenburg-Western Pomerania
21st-century German people